The Foum Gleita Dam is an arch dam on the Gorgol River near Foum Gleita in the Gorgol Region of Mauritania.

An assessment of the dam's stability, taken out in the year 2004, revealed 19 stability and safety issues, mainly due to deferred maintenance. However, the main dam structure was in a stable condition at that time.

References

Dams completed in 1988
Gorgol Region
Dams in Mauritania
Arch dams